Ville Järveläinen (born February 24, 1993) is a Finnish professional ice hockey player. He is currently playing for EHC Bayreuth of the German DEL2 and led the league in goals scored during the 2021/22 season.

Järveläinen made his debut in the Finnish Liiga playing with HPK during the 2012–13 Liiga season. Järveläinen represented Finland at U20 level.

References

External links

1993 births
Living people
EHC Bayreuth players
Green Bay Gamblers players
Peliitat Heinola players
HPK players
SaPKo players
SaiPa players
Finnish ice hockey forwards
People from Hämeenlinna
Sportspeople from Kanta-Häme